Ancón Hill is a  high hill that overlooks Panama City, Panama, adjacent to the township of Ancón. Ancón Hill is an area in Panama that was used for administration of the Panama Canal. It was under U.S. jurisdiction as part of the Panama Canal Zone until being returned to Panama in 1977. Largely undeveloped, the area is now a reserve. The hill includes the highest point in Panama City. 

The summit of the hill can be reached by a 30-minute hike. According to a local Ancon resident, at this time it is no longer possible to drive to the summit of Cerro Ancon (February 12, 2017). Relatively undeveloped it includes jungle in an otherwise urban area, and wildlife still survives cut off from other jungle areas. It is not uncommon to see  sloths, white-nosed coati, nine-banded armadillos, Geoffroy's tamarins, or deer on Ancon Hill, which now has protected status. Its name is used as an acronym by a Panamanian environmental group,  Asociación Nacional para la Conservación de la Naturaleza (ANCON).

The lower slopes contained residences and Gorgas Hospital. Higher up were the residence of the Governor of the Canal Zone and Quarry Heights, where the United States Southern Command was located. Quarry Heights was named for being adjacent to a large rock quarry on one side of the hill, which left a visible cliff face on one side. The hill contains an abandoned underground bunker once manned by the US Southern Command. At the top are two broadcast towers and a small road that reaches them. One-way vehicular traffic is now allowed during daylight hours. Hikers can use the road to reach the summit, and the hill is a popular jogging and hiking trek. Along the path, all manner of vegetation and birds can be seen, including a large number of orchids (which are protected by CITES).

History
When the pirate Henry Morgan sacked Panama City in 1671, his scouts first climbed Ancon Hill to gain knowledge of the local defenses. Ancon Hill overlooks the site of the new city, constructed after Morgan's destruction of the old one.

The hill became part of the land taken to build the canal and a national symbol in 1906 after Amelia Denis de Icaza wrote her poem about its annexation. Today this hill still boasts a large national flag at its summit.

The first ship to officially transit the Panama Canal in 1914, took its name from the hill and surrounding township.

When Panama regained control of the hill following the 1977 Panama Canal Treaty, one of the first things the country did was fly a large Panamanian flag atop the hill.

See also
Protected areas of Panama

References

External links
Cerro Ancon Guide - how to reach the top of Cerro Ancon
Photos of the views from Ancon Hill
Picture of Ancon Hill - showing contrast between the hill and surrounding urban area.
Cerro Ancon - website dedicated to preserving Ancon Hill. (in Spanish)

Mountains of Panama
Panama Canal
Panama City